Kim Ji-won (Hangul: 김지원; born 26 February 1995) is a South Korean badminton player. Kim and her national teammates won the 2013 Suhadinata Cup after beat Indonesian junior team in the final round of the mixed team event. She also won the World Junior Championships girls' doubles title partnered with Chae Yoo-jung.

Achievements

East Asian Games 
Women's doubles

BWF World Junior Championships 
Girls' doubles

Asian Junior Championships 
Girls' doubles

Mixed doubles

BWF International Challenge/Series 
Women's doubles

  BWF International Challenge tournament
  BWF International Series tournament
  BWF Future Series tournament

References

External links 
 

1995 births
Living people
South Korean female badminton players
21st-century South Korean women